10th Parachute Division may refer to:

 10th Parachute Division (France)
 10th Parachute Division (Germany)